This is a list of the 89 episodes of the American ABC/UPN sitcom, The Hughleys.

Series overview

Episodes

Season 1 (1998–99)

Season 2 (1999–2000)

Season 3 (2000–01)

Season 4 (2001–02)

References
 
 

Hughleys